Emmanuel College is a private Christian college in Franklin Springs, Georgia. It is affiliated with the International Pentecostal Holiness Church and enrolls more than 900 students. The college offers both associate and bachelor's degrees.

History
Emmanuel College was founded in 1919 as the Franklin Springs Institute in Franklin Springs, GA. In its first years it taught high school courses grades eight through eleven and three college level courses. The first buildings were two hotels and a skating rink.  In 1931, the college was forced to close for two years during the Great Depression. When the school reopened, the new president, Thomas Aaron, began to refocus the institute's priorities from being a high school to a college. In 1939, the name was changed to Emmanuel College and the high school was called Emmanuel Academy.

The year 1967 saw the Southern Association of Colleges and Schools grant the two year college full accreditation.  During the 1970s, a four-year School of Christian Ministries was established and accredited by the American Association of Bible Colleges and in 1991, major changes to curricular offerings also accompanied accreditation as a four-year institution from the Southern Association of Colleges and Schools Commission on Colleges.

Academics 
Emmanuel College offers over 30 areas of study and confers Associate degrees and bachelor's degrees through its four schools:
 School of Arts and Sciences
 School of Business
 School of Christian Ministries
 School of Education

Emmanuel does not require students to study religion as part of the coursework but there is a weekly chapel service and convocation required for full-time students.

Athletics 

The Emmanuel athletic teams are called the Lions. The college is a member of the Division II level of the National Collegiate Athletic Association (NCAA), primarily competing in the Conference Carolinas as a provisional member since the 2014–15 academic year (with NCAA D-II full member status since 2018–19); while its men's lacrosse team competes in the SouthEastern Lacrosse Conference (SELC); and its men's volleyball team competes in the Mid-America Men's Volleyball Intercollegiate Conference (MAMVIC). They were also a member of the National Christian College Athletic Association (NCCAA), primarily competing as an independent in the South Region of the Division I level. The Lions formerly competed in the Southern States Athletic Conference (SSAC; formerly known as Georgia–Alabama–Carolina Conference (GACC) until after the 2003–04 school year) of the National Association of Intercollegiate Athletics (NAIA) from 1999–2000 to 2013–14.

Emmanuel competes in 32 intercollegiate varsity sports: Men's sports include archery, baseball, basketball, bowling, cross country, golf, lacrosse, soccer, swimming, tennis, track & field, triathlon, volleyball and wrestling; while women's sports include acrobatics & tumbling, archery, basketball, bowling, cross country, golf, lacrosse, soccer, softball, swimming, tennis, track & field, triathlon, volleyball and wrestling; and co-ed sports include bass fishing, cheerleading and clay target shooting.

Club sports/intramurals
For men and women, Emmanuel also offers a wide variety of intramural sports including basketball, football, golf, soccer, tennis, track and field, volleyball, and weightlifting.

Athletics expansion
In recent years, the college has expanded its athletic department. In 2012 Emmanuel College added men's and women's lacrosse, men's volleyball, and clay target shooting along with opening its  athletic center that contains a basketball arena, volleyball court, an indoor track, a fitness center, an aerobics room, a swimming pool, a bowling alley, and a food court. The men's basketball team finished runners up in the NAIA national championship game in 2014, and the cross country team finished third at Nationals in Fall of 2013. The college also announced that men's and women's swimming and men's and women's bowling will be added for the 2013–14 academic year. Wrestling has also been added and will start competing in the 2015–16 school year.

Housing 
A majority of students decide to live in the available on-campus dormitory housing, although that is not a requirement. In recent data, 84.6% of students choose to live on-campus while 14.9% live with family off-campus.

See also
International Pentecostal Holiness Church

References

External links
 Official website
 Official athletics website

 

1919 establishments in Georgia (U.S. state)
Buildings and structures in Franklin County, Georgia
Council for Christian Colleges and Universities
Education in Franklin County, Georgia
Educational institutions established in 1919
Conference Carolinas schools
Universities and colleges accredited by the Southern Association of Colleges and Schools
Private universities and colleges in Georgia (U.S. state)